Sir William Walworth (died 1385) was an English nobleman and politician who was twice Lord Mayor of London (1374–75 and 1380–81). He is best known for killing Wat Tyler during the Peasants' Revolt in 1381.

Political career 
His family came from Durham. He was apprenticed to John Lovekyn, who was a member of the Fishmongers Guild, whom he succeeded as Alderman of Bridge Ward in 1368. Walworth became Sheriff of London in 1370 and Lord Mayor of London in 1374. He was Member of Parliament for the City of London in 1371, 1376, 1377, and 1383, as one of the two aldermanic representatives of the city.

He is said to have suppressed usury in the city during his term of office as Lord Mayor. His name frequently figures as advancing loans to Richard II. He opposed the king's uncle John of Gaunt, 1st Duke of Lancaster in the city, where there was a strong opposition to John.

Business interests 
William Walworth worked for a time in the Customs House under Geoffrey Chaucer. John Gardner, in The Life and Times of Chaucer, contends that Walworth were one of a number of important merchants, all friends of Alice Perrers, who manipulated Edward III. Gardner contends that complaints in the House of Commons demonstrate that this group conspired to keep food prices up, lent money to the king at inflated interest, and through personal and financial influence persuaded the king to issue edicts profitable to themselves.

Peasants' Revolt 

Walworth's most famous exploit was his encounter with Wat Tyler during the English peasants' revolt of 1381, in his second term of office as Lord Mayor. In June of that year, when Tyler and his followers entered south London, Walworth defended London Bridge against them. He was with Richard II when he met the insurgents at Smithfield, and killed the rebel leader with his baselard.

Walworth raised the city bodyguard in the king's defence, for which service he was rewarded by knighthood and a pension. He subsequently served on two commissions to restore the peace in the county of Kent.

Death and legacy 

He died in 1385, and was buried in the church of St. Michael, Crooked Lane, of which he was a considerable benefactor. Sir William Walworth was the most distinguished member of the Fishmongers Guild, and he invariably figured in the pageants prepared by them when one of their members attained the mayoralty. He became a favorite hero in popular tales, and appeared in Richard Johnson's Nine Worthies of London in 1592.

William Walworth is commemorated with a statue on Holborn Viaduct, near the boundary of the City of London.

His wife, Margaret, survived him; she died before 1413.

See also
 List of Sheriffs of the City of London
 List of Lord Mayors of London 
 City of London (elections to the Parliament of England)

References
Attribution:

1385 deaths
Sheriffs of the City of London
14th-century lord mayors of London
English MPs 1371
Year of birth unknown
Members of the Parliament of England for the City of London
Knights Bachelor
English MPs 1376
English MPs January 1377
English MPs February 1383